"Just Breathe" (stylized in all caps) is a song recorded in Japanese, English, and Korean by Japanese rapper Sky-Hi, featuring 3Racha, South Korean production team from Stray Kids, taken from Sky-Hi's sixth studio album The Debut. It was released digitally on February 21, 2022, through Avex Entertainment. It is 3Racha's first commercial song.

Background and release

On February 15, 2022, Sky-Hi tweeted "20220221" and his name with the wolf, pig, rabbit, and chipmunk emojis, while Stray Kids the same numbers and their group name with the sun-behind-small-cloud and backhand-index-pointing-up emojis on the same time. The fans decoded the wolf emoji as Bang Chan, pig and rabbit as Changbin, and chipmunk as Han, which all are from South Korean boy band Stray Kids production team 3Racha. Three days later, they announced to release the single, titled "Just Breathe", featuring 3Racha, on February 21, making it 3Racha's first commercial song after their several mixtapes. The song was revealed for the first time at Sky-Hi's radio show, Imasia.

Lyrics and composition

"Just Breathe" is described as a trap, hip-hop song written in three languages: Japanese, English, and Korean, by Sky-Hi, 3Racha, and Uta. The latter also handles the song's production. Lyrically, the song talks about "the reason for being who I am", showing the sensibilities of the human soul, self-love, and surviving the toughest days of life, and trusting no one except yourself. It was composed in the key of F minor, 113 beats per minute with a running time of three minutes and 50 seconds.

Commercial performance

In Japan, "Just Breathe" entered both Billboard Japan Hot 100 and Oricon Combined Singles Chart at number 50. The song also peaked at number 15 on the Hungarian Single Top 40, and number 11 on the Billboard World Digital Song Sales.

Music video

An accompanying music video for "Just Breathe" premiered on the same date as the single release. Directed by Creative Collective F A T I M A, the music video depicts futuristic racing game based on a playable video game with four avatars representing each artist. It uses clips from gameplay footage of a player manually controlling a motorcycle and a buggy. The video visualizes "the chaos of modern times".

Accolades

Credits and personnel

Credits adapted from YouTube.

Locations
 Prime Sound Studio Form – recording
 Daimonion Recordings – mixing
 Bernie Grundman – mastering
 Avex Music Publishing Inc. – publishing
 JYP Publishing (KOMCA) – publishing
 Sony Music Publishing (Japan) Inc. – publishing

Personnel
 Sky-Hi – writer
 Bang Chan (3Racha) – writer
 Changbin (3Racha) – writer
 Han (3Racha) – writer
 Uta – writer, producer
 Hideaki Jinbu – recording
 D.O.I. – mixing
 Mike Bozzi – mastering

Music video
 Creative Collective F A T I M A – visual director, 3D artist
 C – technical artist, generative design

Charts

Release history

References

2022 singles
2022 songs
Avex Group singles
Japanese-language songs
Korean-language songs
Macaronic songs